Slice to Sharp is a ballet made for New York City Ballet's Diamond Project by Jorma Elo to music by Heinrich Ignaz Franz von Biber and Antonio Vivaldi. The premiere took place on 16 June 2006 at the New York State Theater, Lincoln Center with lighting by Mark Stanley and costumes by Holly Hynes.

Music
von Biber
 Partia VI in D, 3rd movement
Vivaldi

 Concerto. 2 in C, RV189, 3rd movement
 Concerto in G, Op.4, no.3, RV301, 1st movement
 Concerto. 4 in A, Op.4, RV357, 2nd movement
 Concerto in G, Op.4, no.3, RV301, 3rd movement
 Concerto in C, Op.57, no.1, RV507, 3rd movement
 Concerto in A, Op.3, no.5, RV519, 3rd movement
 Concerto in A, Op.3, no.8, RV522, 2nd movement
 Concerto in E flat, Op. 8, no. 5, RV253 1st movement

Original cast
 Wendy Whelan 
 Maria Kowroski 
 Ana Sophia Scheller 
 Sofiane Sylve
 Craig Hall 
 Edwaard Liang 
 Joaquín De Luz 
 Amar Ramasar

Reviews 

 
 NY Times review by John Rockwell, 19 June 2006

 NY Times review by Alastair Macaulay, 18 February 2009

References

2006 ballet premieres
Ballets designed by Holly Hynes
Ballets to the music of Heinrich Ignaz Franz von Biber
Ballets to the music of Antonio Vivaldi
Ballets by Jorma Elo
New York City Ballet Diamond Project
New York City Ballet repertory